Albert Liénard, known as Louis Payen (1875 – 1927) was a French librettist. He was secretary general of the Comédie-Française.

He wrote several librettos for Massenet, Kunc etc.

Works 
1908: La Victoire à Orange. Revival at the Arènes de Nîmes in 1911
1912: La monnaie de singe, four-act comedy (cowritten with Lucie Delarue-Mardrus
Cléopâtre, four acts, music by Jules Massenet.  Premiered posthumously in 1914.
 La Femme nue, drame lyrique in four acts, after the play by Henry Bataille, music by Henry Février

External links 
 Louis Payen on 

People from Alès
1875 births
French opera librettists
1927 deaths
20th-century French non-fiction writers
20th-century French male writers